Huntington Township is one of the fifteen townships of Gallia County, Ohio, United States. As of the 2010 census the population was 1,442, of whom 1,220 lived in the unincorporated portion of the township.

Geography
Located in the northwestern corner of the county, it borders the following townships:
Wilkesville Township, Vinton County - north
Salem Township, Meigs County - northeast corner
Morgan Township - east
Springfield Township - southeast corner
Raccoon Township - south
Madison Township, Jackson County - southwest corner
Bloomfield Township, Jackson County - west
Milton Township, Jackson County - northwest corner

Vinton, the second smallest village in the county, is located in eastern Huntington Township.

The northernmost township in Gallia County, Huntington Township is the only county township to border Vinton County.

Name and history
Statewide, other Huntington Townships are located in Brown, Lorain, and Ross counties.

Government
The township is governed by a three-member board of trustees, who are elected in November of odd-numbered years to a four-year term beginning on the following January 1. Two are elected in the year after the presidential election and one is elected in the year before it. There is also an elected township fiscal officer, who serves a four-year term beginning on April 1 of the year after the election, which is held in November of the year before the presidential election. Vacancies in the fiscal officership or on the board of trustees are filled by the remaining trustees.

References

External links
County website

Townships in Gallia County, Ohio
Townships in Ohio